Oru Visheshapetta Biriyani Kissa is a 2017 Malayalam fantasy comedy film starring Lena in lead role. It is written and directed by Kiran Narayanan. The movie is produced by W L Epic Media.

Plot

Oru Visheshapetta Biriyani Kissa is a Fantasy Comedy Drama. The film opens with one of the Class-Two angels in heaven losing his halo as he appeared in person in front of a kid by mistake, which was against the rules of heaven. Along with his halo, he lost almost all his angelic powers. He goes to the Class-One angel, his mentor and superior, as he wanted to remedy the situation. Class-One angel conveys his helplessness as the rules are against returning the halo once it is gone. After deliberation, he says that there is a way to get the halo back. Class-Two angel has already helped 999,999,999 humans in his career, and if he helps one more human, the total will reach a magic number, after which he can ask for a wish from his superior. To get the halo back, Class-Two angel goes to the heaven’s library and searches the files to find a suitable person whom he can help. He chances upon Thaara’s file. He learns that Thaara was an orphan by birth and a widow.

Thaara lives a quiet life in a fictional village in Kerala, a village which is famous for a mosque and the mosque’s free weekly biriyani meal. The free meal is offered by Sahib, the village head. Though it is a Muslim mosque and a Muslim does this offering, the entire village, regardless of religion and caste, takes part in it. The biriyani served is famous for its taste and the free meal program acts as a societal bonding in the entire village. Unexpectedly the chef who cooks the biriyani passes away and the entire free meal program comes to a standstill. Thaara, who had recently become a widow, is a good cook as she was once blessed by the divine being himself and had won many cooking contests in her past. The story then turns to heaven were the superior angel tells his junior that when Thaara was 19 months old baby she was crying and the angel gave her the skill of cooking. This is why her food has the taste of heaven. Villagers are unaware of Thaara’s culinary skills and the blessings that she got. She volunteers and requests the Sahib to give her a chance to cook biriyani. Some of the villagers object this as they do not see Thaara as a good soul. Thaara is untouched by the recent death of her husband. The Sahib, though reluctant, agrees to Thaara's request.

On Thaara’s first day, a news rock the village. Thaara was pregnant and has delivered a child. The biriyani feast comes to a halt after Thaara gets pregnant. The villagers meet in the presence of Sahib. One of the villagers recommends a famous chef, an outsider to the village. The recommendation is accepted, and the new chef is appointed. But the new chef and the villager who recommended him has an ulterior motive is to steal the valuable stalk which is in the mosque. This takes the film to its climax. The story concludes by revealing Thaara's romantic life, the fatherhood of her child, the hardships she had to face and whether she and her biriyani will get accepted by the villagers or not.

The film starts and ends with a narration by one of the famous chefs in Kerala, thus implying that it was just a story narrated for an FM Radio programme.

Cast

Production
Principal photography of the movie was finished in two schedules, in Thiruvananthapuram and Kozhikode. To portray heaven and heavenly environment, the film used the possibilities of computer graphics.

Guest Appearance

 Ummi Abdulla as herself/Narattor
 Vinay Forrt as Superior Angel (Extended Cameo Appearance)
 Aju Varghese as Junior Angel (Extended Cameo Appearance)
 Lal as Abu Musaliyar Mowlavi
 Bhavana as Kumari Kamalambika

Release and reception
The film was released on 25 August 2017, in 65 screens across Kerala and received mixed reviews. The film chiefly targeted family audience but fared poorly in the theatres as the initial reviews made by the youth were unfairly critical.

Soundtrack
The film's score and soundtrack were composed by Sanjeev Krishna and GK Rao. Song lyrics were written by Suku Maruthathoor and Aji Deivappura.

References

External links 
 

2010s Malayalam-language films
Indian fantasy films
Indian comedy films
Films shot in Thiruvananthapuram
Films shot in Kozhikode
Films scored by Bijibal